Franc Podlesek (born 13 July 1952) is a Slovenian wrestler. He competed in the men's Greco-Roman 74 kg at the 1988 Summer Olympics.

References

1952 births
Living people
Slovenian male sport wrestlers
Olympic wrestlers of Yugoslavia
Wrestlers at the 1988 Summer Olympics
Sportspeople from Ljubljana